Iftop is a free software command-line system monitor tool that produces a frequently updated list of network connections. By default, the connections are ordered by bandwidth usage, with only the "top" bandwidth consumers shown. It is analogous to top, but instead of system-wide resource monitoring, it focuses on displaying network usage and statistics.

Description 
iftop monitors network traffic and displays a table of current bandwidth usage. An interface may be specified or, if not, it will listen on the first interface it finds which looks like an external interface (with libpcap and libncurses). iftop must be run with sufficient permissions to monitor all network traffic: on most systems this means that it must be run as a root user using the sudo command.

By default, iftop will look up hostnames associated with addresses and counts all IP packets that pass through the filter. Hostname look-up can add substantial traffic, in and of itself, and may result in an inaccurate display of network traffic.

A feature of iftop is that it can suppress display of DNS traffic by using a filter code such as "not port domain", or switch it off entirely, by using the -n option or by pressing "n" when the program is running. Using the -F option makes it possible to show packets entering and leaving a given network.

See also
 htop
 netsniff-ng's ifpps top-like statistics tool
 ntop
 MTR (software)
 List of Unix commands

References

External links

Unix network-related software
System administration